Fishing in Ghana is made up of both ocean caught fish, as well as freshwater fishing in lakes and rivers.

History 
The fishing industry's total catch increased considerably in the late 1960s, from 105,100 tons of marine fish caught in 1967 to 230,100 tons in 1971. In 1982 the yield was 234,100 tons, composed of 199,100 tons of marine varieties and 35,000 tons of freshwater fish from Lake Volta. The industry was hit by fuel shortages, inadequate storage facilities, and the general economic difficulties of the 1970s and the 1980s. In 1988 the fish catch was 302,900 tons. In 1991 the catch was 289,675 tons, down from more than 319,000 tons in 1990.

Large-scale poaching by foreign vessels has severely depleted fish stocks in Ghana's  maritime Exclusive Economic Zone, causing major government concern. The most affected stocks are sea bottom-feeding fish. Tuna stocks reportedly remain unaffected. A 1992 Ministry of Food and Agriculture report recommended that the government accelerate mobilization of surveillance and enforcement units and step up regulation of trawler fleets.

In 1992 the government passed a fisheries law to curb overfishing and to help protect the marine environment. Fishermen were banned from catching specified shellfish, and all fishing vessel operators were required to obtain licenses. The law provided for a regulatory body—the Fisheries Monitoring, Control, Surveillance, and Enforcement Unit—as well as a fisheries advisory council. These organizations, however, both of which are underfunded and undermanned, are unlikely to stop illegal fishing activities anytime soon.

Kinds of Fishing 

 Industrial Fishing 
 Marine Artisanal fishing
 Inland Canoe Fishing

Industrial and artisanal fishermen fish the ocean. Artisanal fishing are small scale fishing practices undertaken by households or individuals.

The Volta Lake is the main source of inland fishery in Ghana.The potential of aquaculture in Ghana is important, the actual estimated production reached about 9,000 tons mainly with Tilapia production. The potential for cage culturing for tilapia is steadily increasing.

Fishing Communities 
Some Fishing Communities in Eastern Region include:

 Sumuner       
 Odortorm
 Petefour
 Odomeabra
 Nketepa
 Nrahponya
 Adakope
 Adakope
 Troameleveme
 Gonyokope
 Agaradzi
 Abuakwa
 Kwahu East

These communities are heavily rely on fish for sustenance, income and food security .

Inland Fishing Centers in Ghana 

 Lake Volta
 Bosomtwi 
 Weija
 Barekese
 Tano
 Oti
 Afram
 Bortianor (Tsokome)
 Faana Village Beach
 Oshie
 Korkrobite
 Pra
 Densu 
 Vea 
 Kpong

Contribution of Fishing towards the Ghanaian Economy 
The Fishing sector of the country plays an important role contributing significantly to national economic development objectives related to employment, livelihood support, poverty reduction, food security, foreign exchange earnings and resource sustainability. The sector is estimated to contribute 3% of the total GDP and 5% of the GDP in agriculture. About 10% of the country's population is engaged in various aspects of the fishing industry.

Future Plans For the Ghanaian Fishing Industry 
The current president of Ghana, Nana Akuffo Addo, created a ministry of fisheries and agricultural development in Ghana. On the 9th of April 2018, The current Minister of the Fishery sector in Ghana, Francis Kinsley Ato Cudjoe, announced the “One house, one tank” program which is bound to take effect from May. With this, every house is to own one fish tank. This goes a long way to encourage tank farming across the nation. Again, the encouragement of youth programs to encourage fish farming as a means of reducing the estimated 930,000 metric tons of fishes being imported annually.

See also
Agriculture in Ghana
Economy of Ghana

References

 
Environmental issues in Ghana